Below is the list of populated places in Kırşehir Province, Turkey by the districts. In the following lists first place in each list is the administrative center of the district.

Kırşehir
 Kırşehir
 Akçaağıl, Kırşehir	
 Çadırlıhacıyusuf, Kırşehir	
 Çayağzı, Kırşehir	
 Çuğun, Kırşehir	
 Dedeli, Kırşehir	
 Değirmenkaşı, Kırşehir	
 Dulkadirli, Kırşehir	
 Dulkadirlikaraisa, Kırşehir	
 Dulkadirliyarımkale, Kırşehir	
 Ecikağıl, Kırşehir	
 Göllü, Kırşehir	
 Güzler, Kırşehir	
 Hashüyük, Kırşehir	
 Homurlu Beşler, Kırşehir	
 Homurlu Üçler, Kırşehir	
 Kalankaldı, Kırşehir	
 Karaboğaz, Kırşehir	
 Karaduraklı, Kırşehir	
 Karahıdır, Kırşehir	
 Karalar, Kırşehir	
 Karıncalı, Kırşehir	
 Kartalkaya, Kırşehir	
 Kesikköprü, Kırşehir	
 Kırkpınar, Kırşehir	
 Kocabey, Kırşehir	
 Kortulu, Kırşehir	
 Körpınar, Kırşehir	
 Kurtbeliyeniyapan, Kırşehir	
 Kuruağıl, Kırşehir	
 Özbağ, Kırşehir	
 Saraycık, Kırşehir	
 Sevdiğin, Kırşehir	
 Seyrekköy, Kırşehir	
 Sıdıklıbüyükoba, Kırşehir	
 Sıdıklıdarboğaz, Kırşehir	
 Sıdıklıikizağıl, Kırşehir	
 Sıdıklıkumarkaç, Kırşehir	
 Sıdıklıküçükboğaz, Kırşehir	
 Sıdıklıküçükoba, Kırşehir	
 Sıdıklıortaoba, Kırşehir	
 Taburoğlu, Kırşehir	
 Tatarilyaskışla, Kırşehir	
 Tatarilyasyayla, Kırşehir	
 Tepesidelik, Kırşehir	
 Toklümen, Kırşehir	
 Tosunburnu, Kırşehir	
 Ulupınar, Kırşehir	
 Uzunaliuşağı, Kırşehir	
 Yağmurluarmutlu, Kırşehir	
 Yağmurlubüyükoba, Kırşehir	
 Yağmurlukale, Kırşehir	
 Yağmurlusayobası, Kırşehir	
 Yeşilli, Kırşehir	
 Yeşiloba, Kırşehir	
 Yukarı Homurlu, Kırşehir

Akpınar
 Akpınar
 Alişar, Akpınar	
 Aşağıhomurlu, Akpınar	
 Boyalık, Akpınar	
 Büyükabdiuşağı, Akpınar	
 Çalıburnu, Akpınar	
 Çayözü, Akpınar	
 Çebişler, Akpınar	
 Çelebiuşağı, Akpınar	
 Çiftlikmehmetağa, Akpınar	
 Çiftliksarıkaya, Akpınar	
 Demirci, Akpınar	
 Deveci, Akpınar	
 Durmuşlu, Akpınar	
 Eldeleklidemirel, Akpınar	
 Eldelekliortaoba, Akpınar	
 Eşrefli, Akpınar	
 Gülveren, Akpınar	
 Hacımirza, Akpınar	
 Hacıselimli, Akpınar	
 Hanyerisarıkaya, Akpınar	
 Himmetuşağı, Akpınar	
 Karaova, Akpınar	
 Kelismailuşağı, Akpınar	
 Köşker, Akpınar	
 Pekmezci, Akpınar	
 Sofrazlı, Akpınar

Akçakent
 Akçakent
 Avanoğlu, Akçakent		
 Ayvalı, Akçakent		147
 Derefakılı, Akçakent		123
 Güllühüyük, Akçakent		75
 Hacıfakılı, Akçakent		256
 Hamzabey, Akçakent		358
 Hasanali, Akçakent		90
 Kilimli, Akçakent		333
 Kösefakılı, Akçakent		149
 Küçükabdiuşağı, Akçakent		
 Mahsenli, Akçakent		84
 Ödemişli, Akçakent		74
 Ömeruşağı, Akçakent		684
 Polatlı, Akçakent		481
 Solakuşağı, Akçakent		198
 Taşlıoluk, Akçakent		179
 Tepefakılı, Akçakent		144
 Yaylaözü, Akçakent		135
 Yeşildere, Akçakent		173
 Yetikli, Akçakent		48

Boztepe
 Boztepe
 Alişar, Akpınar	
 Aşağıhomurlu, Akpınar	
 Boyalık, Akpınar	
 Büyükabdiuşağı, Akpınar	
 Çalıburnu, Akpınar	
 Çayözü, Akpınar	
 Çebişler, Akpınar	
 Çelebiuşağı, Akpınar	
 Çiftlikmehmetağa, Akpınar	
 Çiftliksarıkaya, Akpınar	
 Demirci, Akpınar	
 Deveci, Akpınar	
 Durmuşlu, Akpınar	
 Eldeleklidemirel, Akpınar	
 Eldelekliortaoba, Akpınar	
 Eşrefli, Akpınar	
 Gülveren, Akpınar	
 Hacımirza, Akpınar	
 Hacıselimli, Akpınar	
 Hanyerisarıkaya, Akpınar	
 Himmetuşağı, Akpınar	
 Karaova, Akpınar	
 Kelismailuşağı, Akpınar	
 Köşker, Akpınar	
 Pekmezci, Akpınar	
 Sofrazlı, Akpınar

Çiçekdağı
 Çiçekdağı
 Akbıyıklı, Çiçekdağı	
 Alahacılı, Çiçekdağı	
 Alanköy, Çiçekdağı	
 Alimpınar, Çiçekdağı	
 Armutlu, Çiçekdağı	
 Aşağıhacıahmetli, Çiçekdağı	
 Bahçepınar, Çiçekdağı	
 Baraklı, Çiçekdağı	
 Beşikli, Çiçekdağı	
 Boğazevci, Çiçekdağı	
 Bozlar, Çiçekdağı	
 Büyükteflek, Çiçekdağı	
 Çanakpınar, Çiçekdağı	
 Çepni, Çiçekdağı	
 Çiçekli, Çiçekdağı	
 Çopraşık, Çiçekdağı	
 Çubuktarla, Çiçekdağı	
 Demirli, Çiçekdağı	
 Doğankaş, Çiçekdağı	
 Gölcük, Çiçekdağı	
 Hacıduraklı, Çiçekdağı	
 Hacıhasanlı, Çiçekdağı	
 Hacıoğlu, Çiçekdağı	
 Halaçlı, Çiçekdağı	
 Harmanpınar, Çiçekdağı	
 Haydarlı, Çiçekdağı	
 İbikli, Çiçekdağı	
 Kabaklı, Çiçekdağı	
 Kaleevci, Çiçekdağı	
 Kavaklıöz, Çiçekdağı	
 Kırdök, Çiçekdağı	
 Kızılcalı, Çiçekdağı	
 Konurkale, Çiçekdağı	
 Köseli, Çiçekdağı	
 Küçükteflek, Çiçekdağı	
 Mahmutlu, Çiçekdağı	
 Ortahacıahmetli, Çiçekdağı	
 Pöhrenk, Çiçekdağı	
 Safalı, Çiçekdağı	
 Şahinoğlu, Çiçekdağı	
 Tatbekirli, Çiçekdağı	
 Tepecik, Çiçekdağı	
 Topalali, Çiçekdağı	
 Yalnızağaç, Çiçekdağı	
 Yukarıhacıahmetli, Çiçekdağı

Kaman
 Kaman
 Ağapınar, Kaman	
 Aydınlar, Kaman	
 Başköy, Kaman	
 Bayındır, Kaman	
 Bayramözü, Kaman	
 Benzer, Kaman	
 Büğüz, Kaman	
 Çadırlı Hacıbayram, Kaman	
 Çadırlı Körmehmet, Kaman	
 Çağırkan, Kaman	
 Darıözü, Kaman	
 Değirmenözü, Kaman	
 Demirli, Kaman	
 Esentepe, Kaman	
 Fakılı, Kaman	
 Gökeşme, Kaman	
 Gültepe, Kaman	
 Hamit, Kaman	
 Hirfanlı, Kaman	
 İbrişim, Kaman	
 İkizler, Kaman	
 İmancı, Kaman	
 İsahocalı, Kaman	
 Kale, Kaman	
 Karahabalı, Kaman	
 Karakaya, Kaman	
 Kargınyenice, Kaman	
 Karkınkızıközü, Kaman	
 Karkınmeşe, Kaman	
 Karkınselimağa, Kaman	
 Kekilliali, Kaman	
 Kurancılı, Kaman	
 Meşeköy, Kaman	
 Mollaosmanlar, Kaman	
 Ömerhacılı, Kaman	
 Ömerkahya, Kaman	
 Sarıömerli, Kaman	
 Savcılıbağbaşı, Kaman	
 Savcılıbüyükoba, Kaman	
 Savcılıebeyit, Kaman	
 Savcılıkışla, Kaman	
 Savcılıkurutlu, Kaman	
 Savcılımeryemkaşı, Kaman	
 Tatık, Kaman	
 Tepeköy, Kaman	
 Yağmurlu Sarıuşağı, Kaman	
 Yazıyolu, Kaman	
 Yelek, Kaman	
 Yeniköy, Kaman	
 Yeniyapan, Kaman	
 Yukarı Çiftlik, Kaman

Mucur
 Mucur
 Aksaklı Mucur	
 Altınyazı, Mucur	
 Asmakaradam, Mucur	
 Avcıköy, Mucur	
 Aydoğmuş, Mucur	
 Babur, Mucur	
 Bayramuşağı, Mucur	
 Bazlamaç, Mucur	
 Budak, Mucur	
 Büyükkayapa, Mucur	
 Çatalarkaç, Mucur	
 Dağçiftliğiköyü, Mucur	
 Dalakçı, Mucur	
 Devepınarı, Mucur	
 Geycek, Mucur	
 Gümüşkümbet, Mucur	
 Güzyurdu, Mucur	
 İnaç, Mucur	
 Karaarkaç, Mucur	
 Karacalı, Mucur	
 Karakuyu, Mucur	
 Karkın, Mucur	
 Kepez, Mucur	
 Kılıçlı, Mucur	
 Kıran, Mucur	
 Kızılağıl, Mucur	
 Kızıldağyeniyapan, Mucur	
 Kurugöl, Mucur	
 Kuşaklı, Mucur	
 Küçükburnağıl, Mucur	
 Küçükkavak, Mucur	
 Küçükkayapa, Mucur	
 Medetsiz, Mucur	
 Obruk, Mucur	
 Palangıç, Mucur	
 Pınarkaya, Mucur	
 Rahmalar, Mucur	
 Seyfe, Mucur	
 Susuz, Mucur	
 Yazıkınık, Mucur	
 Yeğenağa, Mucur	
 Yeniköy, Mucur	
 Yeşilyurt, Mucur	
 Yürücek, Mucur

References

Kırşehir Province
Kırşehir
List